Founded in 2010, the Puget Sound Collegiate League (PSCL) is a collegiate summer baseball league based in the Olympia, Washington area.

The league also manages a summer youth league, camps and tournaments. In addition, a high school league, Pudget Sound Fall Ball, was formed for area high school teams.

History 
The league was originated by the forming of the Tacoma Cardinals (2006) followed by the Olympia Athletics (2007). PSCL opened its first season in 2010 with six teams.

League founder and president Matt Acker also owns the West Coast Guns, an independent team. In 2014 Acker took ownership of the Kitsap BlueJackets a West Coast League team. In 2017 he moved the WCL franchise to Port Angeles and they became the Port Angeles Lefties.  The Kitsap BlueJackets became a semi-professional team, who compete in the Pacific International League (PIL) starting in 2017. The West Coast Guns were also members of the PIL.

Thurston County Senators, an affiliated team who play a full league schedule, are not eligible for PSCL playoffs. The semi-professional team is made up of former PSCL alumni and compete in elite tournaments, including the Grand Forks International and World Baseball Challenge.

Teams

NOTE: Senators are an affiliate of the PSCL. The team also plays games against the teams of Pacific International League, West Coast League, tournaments and other amateur teams.

Champions

References

External links
 Puget Sound Collegiate League
 Pudget Sound Fall Ball

Summer baseball leagues
Baseball in Washington (state)
College baseball leagues in the United States